The Further Adventures of the Flag Lieutenant is a 1927 British silent action film directed by W. P. Kellino and starring Henry Edwards, Isabel Jeans and Lilian Oldland.

Production
The film was made at Twickenham Studios by the German-born independent producer Julius Hagen. It was released as a sequel to The Flag Lieutenant which had been a major hit the previous year. It was also released with the alternative title Further Adventures of a Flag Officer. A third in the series, a sound film The Flag Lieutenant, was released in 1932.

Cast
 Henry Edwards as Lieutenant Dicky Lascelles 
 Isabel Jeans as Pauline 
 Lilian Oldland as Sybil Wynne 
 Lyn Harding as The Sinister Influence 
 Fewlass Llewellyn as Admiral Wynne 
 Fred Raynham as Colonel William Thesiger

References

Bibliography
 Low, Rachael. History of the British Film, 1918–1929. George Allen & Unwin, 1971.
 Wood, Linda. ''British Films 1927–1939. British Film Institute, 1986.

External links

1927 films
1920s action films
British action films
Films directed by W. P. Kellino
British silent feature films
Films shot at Twickenham Film Studios
Seafaring films
British black-and-white films
British sequel films
1920s English-language films
1920s British films
Silent adventure films